The third edition of the Hip Hop World Awards was hosted by comedian Basketmouth and Nollywood actress Dakore Egbuson. It was held on 15 March 2008 at Planet One in Maryland, Lagos, Nigeria. Nigerian-French singer Aṣa won 3 awards, including Album of the Year for her eponymous debut studio album. 2face Idibia received the most nominations with six.

Winners and nominees
Winners are emboldened.

References

2008 music awards
2008 in Nigerian music
The Headies